Andrew John Knight (born 29 September 1953) is an Australian TV writer and producer of film and television, known for his work on Rake, Jack Irish, Hacksaw Ridge, Ali's Wedding and The Water Diviner.

In 1989, he co founded, with Steve Vizard, the production company Artist Services,  and in 2000, he formed Cornerstore Films, which has produced three major television series including the award-winning After The Deluge, which Andrew wrote and produced.

At the 2015 AACTA Awards, Knight received the Longford Lyell Award for Outstanding Lifetime Achievement. Other awards include the 2015 Australian Writers' Guild Award for An Original Feature Film Script, The Water Diviner (co-written with Andrew Anastasios), the 2016 AACTA Award for Best Original Screenplay, Hacksaw Ridge (co-written with Robert Schenkkan), the 2016 Australian Writers' Guild Award for An Original Feature Film Script Ali's Wedding (co-written with Osamah Sami), and the 2017 AACTA Award for Best Original Screenplay Ali's Wedding.

Knight co-produced and wrote The Broken Shore, produced and wrote Siam Sunset for Artist Services, and wrote telemovie Mumbo Jumbo. He has also been involved in some of Australia’s most iconic comedy, co-producing and writing for The Fast Lane, Fast Forward, The D-Generation, and writing for Full Frontal. He was co-creator, principal writer and executive producer of the ABC’s immensely popular drama SeaChange.

References

External links
 

1953 births
Living people
Australian television writers
Place of birth missing (living people)
Australian television producers
Australian male television writers
Monash University alumni